David Miladinović (born May 18, 1997) is a Serbian basketball player for Sloboda Užice of the Basketball League of Serbia.

Early career 
Miladinović grew up with the Crvena zvezda youth team. He won the 2014 Euroleague NIJT.

Playing career 
Miladinović started his professional basketball career in 2014 with FMP from Belgrade where he played for two seasons in the Basketball League of Serbia. During the 2016–17 season, he played for the Napredak Rubin from Kruševac. Prior to the 2017–18 season, he signed for the Dynamic VIP PAY of the Basketball League of Serbia and the ABA League Second Division. He left Dynamic in summer 2018.

Miladinović played for AV Ohrid during the 2018–19 season. Miladinović signed for Kumanovo for the 2019–20 season.

International career 
Miladinović was a member of the Serbian U-16 national basketball team that won the silver medal at the 2013 FIBA Europe Under-16 Championship in Ukraine. He was a member of the Serbian U-17 national basketball team that won the bronze medal at the 2014 FIBA Under-17 World Championship in the United Arab Emirates.

References

External links 
 Profile at aba-liga.com
 Player Profile at eurobasket.com
 Player Profile at realgm.com

1997 births
Living people
Basketball League of Serbia players
KK Crvena zvezda youth players
KK Dynamic players
KK FMP players
KK Napredak Kruševac players
KK Sloboda Užice players
OKK Novi Pazar players
People from Smederevska Palanka
Serbian expatriate basketball people in North Macedonia
Serbian expatriate basketball people in Slovakia
Serbian men's basketball players
Centers (basketball)